Carex lepidocarpa, called the long-stalked yellow-sedge, is a species of flowering plant in the genus Carex, native to eastern Canada, Morocco, and most of Europe. It is a member of the Carex flava species complex.

Subtaxa
The following subspecies are currently accepted:
Carex lepidocarpa subsp. ferraria Jim.-Mejías & Martín-Bravo  – Atlas Mountains of Morocco 
Carex lepidocarpa subsp. jemtlandica Palmgr. – north and northeast Europe
Carex lepidocarpa subsp. lepidocarpa
Carex lepidocarpa subsp. nevadensis (Boiss. & Reut.) Luceño – southeast Spain
Carex lepidocarpa subsp. scotica E.W.Davies – Scotland

References

lepidocarpa
Plants described in 1834